The Mittaghorn is a mountain of the Bernese Alps, located on the border between the cantons of Bern and Valais. It is situated in the middle of the Lauterbrunnen Wall.

References

External links
 Mittaghorn on Hikr
 Mittaghorn on Summitpost

Mountains of the Alps
Alpine three-thousanders
Mountains of Switzerland
Mountains of Valais
Mountains of the canton of Bern
Bern–Valais border
Bernese Alps
Three-thousanders of Switzerland